John Creighton, D.D. was a 17th-century Anglican Dean in Ireland.

Crosse was Chancellor of Christ Church Cathedral, Dublin from 1643 to 1661  and Dean of Ferns from 1666 to 1670

References

Irish Anglicans
Deans of Ferns